Army Education Corps may refer to:
Army Education Corps (India), a corps of the Indian Army
Royal Army Educational Corps, a corps of the British Army